William Thomas Rice (June 13, 1912 – February 5, 2006) was an American railroad executive from Virginia. He worked in railroading throughout his life, and also served in the Army Reserves where he became a major general. Along with Hays T. Watkins, Rice's work led to the formation of CSX Transportation in 1980.

Career
Rice was born in 1912 in Westmoreland County, Virginia. His career started as a track inspector for the Pennsylvania Railroad in 1934, after graduating at the top of his civil engineering class at Virginia Tech. By 1955, he became president of the Richmond, Fredericksburg and Potomac Railroad. In 1957, he was made president of the Atlantic Coast Line Railroad, succeeding Champ Davis. By 1967, he was named president, director and CEO of the Seaboard Coast Line Railroad, the product of merging the ACL with the Seaboard Air Line Railroad. Rice rose to chairman of SCL parent Seaboard Coast Line Industries, and the Family Lines System which included SCL. In 1980, Rice and Hays T. Watkins guided the creation of CSX Corporation by merging the Chessie System and the SCL. After the merger was complete, he was named chairman emeritus.

Honors
Rice earned many honors, including "Transportation Man of the Year"  in 1972 and "Railroad Man of the Year" in 1975. In 1987, CSX's classification yard in Waycross, Georgia, was named for him. In 2000, the non-profit Virginians for High Speed Rail created an award "The W. Thomas Rice Rail Renaissance Award" named in his honor which was presented to individuals for their leadership in rail transportation development.

Personal life
William Thomas Rice married Jaqueline Johnston and together they had two children, John Thomas Rice and Jaqueline "Lynn" Rice, over 67 years of marriage. He lost his son to cancer in 2003. Rice, who died in 2006, was survived by his daughter, daughter-in-law Grace, seven grandchildren, and twelve great-grandchildren.

References

1912 births
2006 deaths
People from Westmoreland County, Virginia
Virginia Tech alumni
American chief executives
United States Army reservists
Atlantic Coast Line Railroad
Seaboard Coast Line Railroad
CSX Transportation
20th-century American railroad executives